The Secret of Santa Maria (German:Das Geheimnis der Santa Maria) is a 1921 German silent film directed by Lothar Mendes.

The film's sets were designed by the art director Julian Ballenstedt.

Cast
In alphabetical order
 Michael Bohnen
 Louis Brody
 Karl Etlinger 
 Maria Forescu 
 Rudolf Forster 
 Käthe Haack 
 Eugen Jensen 
 Georg John 
 Robert Leffler 
 Olga Limburg 
 Edith Meller 
 Paul Rehkopf 
 Georg H. Schnell 
 Fritz Schulz 
 Herbert Stock 
 Hanni Weisse

References

Bibliography
 Hans-Michael Bock and Tim Bergfelder. The Concise Cinegraph: An Encyclopedia of German Cinema. Berghahn Books.

External links

1921 films
Films of the Weimar Republic
Films directed by Lothar Mendes
German silent feature films
German black-and-white films